Hoseynabad-e Madvar (also Romanized as Ḩoseynābād-e Madvār; also known as Ḩoseynābād) is a village in Khursand Rural District, in the Central District of Shahr-e Babak County, Kerman Province, Iran. At the 2006 census, its population was 20, in 4 families.

References 

Populated places in Shahr-e Babak County